The Canon EOS D60 is a discontinued 6.3 megapixel digital single lens reflex (DSLR) camera body, announced by Canon on February 22, 2002. It is part of the Canon EOS range, and accepts Canon EF, TS-E and MP-E lenses, but not Canon's later digital-only EF-S lens range.

The EOS D60 sits in the prosumer (professional-consumer) line of digital SLR cameras. It succeeded the three megapixel EOS D30 and was replaced by the improved, six megapixel EOS 10D.

In America, its initial pricing was US$1,999 for the basic body, or US$2,199 including battery, charger, and DC kit.

Features
The EOS D60 features:
 22.7 x 15.1 mm CMOS sensor (APS-C)
 6.3 megapixel effective (6.3 megapixel total)
 Max resolution 3072 x 2048
 FOV crop (1.6x)
 Canon EF lens mount (excludes EF-S)
 3-point auto focus
 100, 200, 400, 800, 1000 ISO speed equivalent
 30 to 1/4000 s shutter speed and bulb
 TTL 35 zone SPC metering: evaluative, center weighted, partial
 Exposure compensation -2 EV to +2 EV in 1/3 EV or 1/2 EV steps
 Auto White Balance (plus 5 positions & manual preset)
 Eye-level pentaprism viewfinder
 1.8 in (46 mm) color TFT liquid-crystal monitor
 E-TTL flash mode
 3 frames per second continuous shooting (max. 8 frames)
 Dimensions (WxHxD): 150 x 107 x 75 mm (6.0 x 4.4 x 2.9 in)
 Weight (body only): 780 g''

References

External links

 Product Page   - archived on the Wayback machine here
 dpreview.com's Canon EOS D60 Review

D60

eo:Canon EOS D30